Finkovo is a small settlement north of Velike Poljane in the Municipality of Ribnica in southern Slovenia. It has only four houses and no longer has any permanent residents. The area is part of the traditional region of Lower Carniola and is now included in the Southeast Slovenia Statistical Region.

References

External links
Finkovo on Geopedia

Populated places in the Municipality of Ribnica